Anthony Scott (born September 18, 1951) is a former American professional baseball center fielder and coach.

Career

Montreal Expos
Scott was drafted by the Montreal Expos in the 71st round of the 1969 Major League Baseball draft. He appeared in eleven games as a pinch runner, and received only one at-bat, in which he struck out.

He batted .191 with eleven runs batted in and no home runs through the All-Star break, and was replaced in center by Pepe Mangual for the rest of the season.

St. Louis Cardinals
He was traded along with Steve Dunning and Pat Scanlon from the Expos to the St. Louis Cardinals for Bill Greif, Sam Mejías and Ángel Torres on November 8, 1976. All three players coming to St. Louis had spent the 1976 season with the Denver Bears which were led by recently-hired Cardinals manager Vern Rapp.

Scott enjoyed moderate success with the Cardinals, as he batted .291 with three home runs and 41 RBIs sharing playing time with Jerry Mumphrey during his first season in St. Louis. He responded by hitting six home runs while driving in 68 runs and stealing 37 bases, all career highs.

Houston Astros
Scott was dealt from the Cardinals to the Houston Astros for Joaquín Andújar on June 6, . He was hitting .227 and mired in a 2-for-43 slump at the time of the transaction. He had also fallen behind Dane Iorg and Tito Landrum on the team's outfielder depth chart.

Scott batted .293 and provided a steady glove in centerfield in the spacious Astrodome his first season in Houston. Released by the Astros after hitting .190 in 25 games, he returned to the Expos two weeks later on June 29, 1984.

Career stats

In , Scott batted .360 in 51 games with the Winter Haven Super Sox of the Senior Professional Baseball Association.

References

External links

1951 births
Living people
African-American baseball coaches
African-American baseball players
Águilas del Zulia players
American expatriate baseball players in Venezuela
American expatriate baseball players in Canada
Baseball players from Cincinnati
Denver Bears players
Gulf Coast Expos players
Houston Astros players
Jamestown Falcons players
Major League Baseball outfielders
Memphis Blues players
Minor league baseball managers
Montreal Expos players
Philadelphia Phillies coaches
Québec Carnavals players
St. Louis Cardinals players
Sun City Rays players
Watertown Expos players
West Palm Beach Expos players
Winter Haven Super Sox players
21st-century African-American people
20th-century African-American sportspeople